Christopher S. Rodgers (born 5 March 1976) is an English professional golfer.

Rodgers turned professional in 2000. He currently plays mainly on the Asian Tour and in 2005 he moved to Bangkok. His first Asian Tour win came at the 2006 Pakistan Open. In 2003 he won twice on the Elite Tour, a developmental tour based in the United Kingdom.

Professional wins (2)

Asian Tour wins (1)

Asian Tour playoff record (0–1)

Other wins (1)
2010 Camry Invitational (China)

Team appearances
Amateur
European Youths' Team Championship (representing England): 1996

References

External links

English male golfers
Asian Tour golfers
European Tour golfers
1976 births
Living people